Wilson's Cave is a cave in the British Overseas Territory of Gibraltar. It was named after Major W. H. Wilson, Royal Engineers, Company Commander.

Location
Magazine Ramp, Great North Road Tunnel (circa 1944).

History
Wilson's Cave is a large natural limestone cave within the Rock of Gibraltar. It was discovered by the military during World War II during excavation of Magazine Ramp near Green Lane Magazine whilst carrying out extensive tunnelling within the  Rock. The miners were developing a structure to absorb a possible blast (known as a blast trap) from an exploding magazine when part of the tunnel caved into the natural cavity. The magazine was served from Doncaster Adit off the Great North Road which supplied vehicular access to the outside.

See also
List of caves in Gibraltar

References

Caves of Gibraltar